Champney's West is a community and former town in the Canadian province of Newfoundland and Labrador. The village had a population of 75 in the Canada 2001 Census, the last year in which Statistics Canada reported data for Champney's West (since then, it is part of the designated place Champneys-English Harbour). The community is part of a group of communities known as Trinity Bight.

See also
 List of cities and towns in Newfoundland and Labrador

References

Populated places in Newfoundland and Labrador